Manjima Kuriakose is the first Olympian from Wayanad,Kerala. She was a part of the 4x400 m women relay team at Sydney Olympics in the year 2000. Apart from that, she also won a medal at the Asian Games in 2002 in Athletics. Her fellow athlete Aloysious has alleged that Manjima was a victim of discriminations in terms of opportunities where athletes from North India were giving priorities and that Manjima was sidelined for the (women's) 400 metres relay at the Asian Games. Manjima later became the Deputy Commandant in the Central Reserve Police Force.

References 

Sportspeople from Kerala
Year of birth missing (living people)
Living people
Athletes (track and field) at the 2000 Summer Olympics